Caryophyllaceae, commonly called the pink family or carnation family, is a family of flowering plants. It is included in the dicotyledon order Caryophyllales in the APG III system, alongside 33 other families, including Amaranthaceae, Cactaceae, and Polygonaceae. It is a large family, with 81 genera and about 2,625 known species.

This cosmopolitan family of mostly herbaceous plants is best represented in temperate climates, with a few species growing on tropical mountains. Some of the more commonly known members include pinks and carnations (Dianthus), and firepink and campions (Lychnis and Silene). Many species are grown as ornamental plants, and some species are widespread weeds. Most species grow in the Mediterranean and bordering regions of Europe and Asia. The number of genera and species in the Southern Hemisphere is rather small, although the family does contain Antarctic pearlwort (Colobanthus quitensis), the world's southernmost dicot, which is one of only two flowering plants found in Antarctica.

The name comes from Caryophyllus, an obsolete synonym of Dianthus.

Description
Despite its size and the somewhat doubtful mutual relationships, this family is rather uniform and easily recognizable.

Most are herbaceous annuals or perennials, dying off above ground each year. A few species are shrubs or small trees, such as some Acanthophyllum species. Most plants are non-succulent; i.e. having no fleshy stems or leaves. The nodes on the stem are swollen. The leaves are almost always opposite, rarely whorled. The blades are entire, petiolate, and often stipulate. These stipules are not sheath-forming.

The hermaphroditic flowers are terminal, blooming singly or branched or forked in cymes. The inflorescence is usually dichasial at least in the lower parts, which means that in the axil of each peduncle (primary flower stalk) of the terminal flower in the cyme, two new single-flower branches sprout up on each side of and below the first flower. If the terminal flowers are absent, then this can lead to monochasia, i.e. a monoparous cyme with a single flower on each axis of the inflorescence. In the extreme, this leads to a single flower, such as in Githago or Arenaria. The flowers are regular and mostly with five petals and five sepals, but sometimes with four petals. The sepals may be free from one another or united. The petals may be entire, fringed or deeply cleft. The calyx may be cylindrically inflated, as in Silene. The stamens number five or 10 (or more rarely four or eight), and are mostly isomerous with the perianth. The superior gynoecium has two to five carpels (members of a compound pistil) and is syncarpous; i.e. with these carpels united in a compound ovary. This ovary has one chamber inside the ovary. The fruit may be a utricle with a single seed or a capsule containing several seeds.

Systematics

Currently, Amaranthaceae and Caryophyllaceae are sister groups and considered closely related.

Formerly, Caryophyllaceae were considered the sister family to all of the remaining members of the suborder Caryophyllineae because they have anthocyanins, and not betalain pigments. However, cladistic analyses indicate Caryophyllaceae evolved from ancestors that contained betalain, reinforcing betalain as an accurate synapomorphy of the suborder.

This family is traditionally divided in three subfamilies:
 Alsinoideae: no stipules, petals not united
 Silenoideae: no stipules, petals united
 Paronychioideae: fleshy stipules, petals separate or united

The last, however, are a basal grade of rather primitive members of this family, not closely related, but simply retaining many plesiomorphic traits. Instead of a subfamily, most ought to be treated as genera incertae sedis, but Corrigiola and Telephium might warrant recognition as Corrigioleae. The Alsinoideae, on the other hand, seem to form two distinct clades, perhaps less some misplaced genera. Finally, the Silenoideae appear monophyletic at least for the most part, if some of the taxa misplaced in Alsinoideae are moved there; it may be that the name Caryophylloideae would apply for the revised delimitation.

However, hybridization between many members of this family is rampant—particularly in the Silenoideae/Caryophylloideae—and some of the lineages of descent have been found to be highly complicated and do not readily yield to cladistic analysis.

Genera

 Acanthophyllum
 Achyronychia – onyxflower, frost-mat
 Agrostemma – corncockles
 Allochrusa
 Alsinidendron
 Ankyropetalum
 Arenaria – sandworts
 Balkana
 Bolanthus
 Bolbosaponaria
 Brachystemma
 Bufonia
 Cardionema
 Cerastium – mouse-ear chickweeds
 Cerdia
 Colobanthus – pearlworts
 Cometes
 Corrigiola – strapworts
 Cucubalus
 Cyathophylla
 Dianthus – carnations and pinks
 Diaphanoptera
 Dicheranthus
 Drymaria
 Drypis
 Eremogone
 Eudianthe
 Facchinia
 Geocarpon
 Graecobolanthus
 Gymnocarpos
 Gypsophila – gypsophilas, baby's-breath
 Habrosia
 Haya
Heliosperma
 Herniaria – ruptureworts
 Holosteum – jagged chickweeds
 Honckenya
 Illecebrum
 Kabulia
 Krauseola
 Kuhitangia
 Lepyrodiclis
 Lochia
 Loeflingia
 Lychnis – campions, catchflies
 Melandrium
 Mesostemma
 Microphyes
 Minuartia – sandworts, stitchworts
 Moehringia – sandworts
 Moenchia – upright chickweeds
 Myosoton
 Ochotonophila
 Ortegia
 Paronychia – chickweeds
 Pentastemonodiscus
 Petroana
 Petrocoptis
 Petrorhagia (previously known as Tunica)
 Philippiella
 Phrynella
 Pinosia
 Pirinia
 Pleioneura
 Plettkia
 Pollichia
 Polycarpaea
 Polycarpon
 Polytepalum
 Psammophiliella
 Pseudostellaria
 Pteranthus
 Pycnophyllopsis
 Pycnophyllum
 Reicheella
 Sabulina
 Sagina – pearlworts
 Sanctambrosia
 Saponaria – soapworts
 Schiedea
 Scleranthopsis
 Scleranthus – knawels
 Sclerocephalus
 Scopulophila
 Selleola
 Silene – campions, catchflies
 Spergula – spurreys
 Spergularia – sea-spurreys
 Sphaerocoma
 Stellaria – chickweeds, stitchworts
 Stipulicida
 Thurya
 Thylacospermum
 Uebelinia
 Vaccaria
 Velezia
 Wilhelmsia
 Xerotia

Unplaced
 Dadjoua  described in 1960 in Fl. Iran and accepted by Catalogue of life, but unplaced by Plants of the World Online.

References

External links
 
Family Caryophyllaceae - Pink Plant Life Forms

 
Caryophyllales families